Roy Miller may refer to:

Doc Miller (Roy Oscar Miller, 1883–1938), baseball player
Roy Andrew Miller (1924–2014), American linguist
Roy Miller (footballer) (born 1984), Costa Rican footballer
Roy Miller (cricketer) (1924–2014), Jamaican cricketer
Roy Miller (American football) (born 1987), American football defensive tackle
Roy Miller (academic) (1935–2021), British academic
Henry Pomeroy Miller (1884–1946), known as Roy, "boy mayor" of Corpus Christi, Texas (1913–1919)
Roy Miller, a character in the 2010 action comedy film Knight and Day
Roy Miller, a character in the 2010 action thriller film Green Zone

See also
Roy Millar, Irish FA's director of coaching